In general, a sample is a limited quantity of something which is intended to be similar to and represent a larger amount of that thing(s). The things could be countable objects such as individual items available as units for sale, or an uncountable material. Even though the word "sample" implies a smaller quantity taken from a larger amount, sometimes full biological or mineralogical specimens are called samples if they are taken for analysis, testing, or investigation like other samples. They are also considered samples in the sense that even whole specimens are "samples" of the full population of many individual organisms. The act of obtaining a sample is called "sampling" and can be performed manually by a person or by automatic process. Samples of material can be taken or provided for testing, analysis, investigation, quality control, demonstration, or trial use. Sometimes, sampling may be performed continuously.

Aliquot part
In science, a representative liquid sample taken from a larger amount of liquid is sometimes called an aliquot or aliquot part where the sample is an exact divisor of the whole. For example, 10mL would be an aliquot part of a 100mL sample.

Sample characteristics
The material may be solid, liquid, gas, a material of some intermediate characteristics such as gel or sputum, tissue, organism, or a combination of these. Even if a material sample is not countable as individual items, the quantity of the sample may still be describable in terms of its volume, mass, size, or other such dimensions. A solid sample can come in one or a few discrete pieces, or it can be fragmented, granular, or powdered. A section of a rod, wire, cord, sheeting, or tubing may be considered a sample. Samples which are not a solid piece are commonly kept in a container of some sort.

See also
Core sample
Ice core
Specimen (disambiguation)

References

 Analytical chemistry
 Clinical pathology
 Laboratories